Achhnera, (alternate spelling: Achnera) is a town and a municipal board in Agra district in the Indian state of Uttar Pradesh.

History
There are multiple theories regarding the foundation of Achhnera. According to one, it was founded by Achhnidhar Jats in  1250 AD, while according to another it was founded by Anangpal Tomar of the Tomara dynasty. In 1738 AD, King Suraj Mal of Bharatpur gave the jagir of Achhnera and 23 villages to his son-in-law. Achhnera also served as the headquarter of a pargana during Jat rule.

Geography
It has an average elevation of 167 metres (547 feet). It is famous for its cultural values; people of different religions live here. There are many temples which have historic values. Achhnera comes under Tehsil Kiraoli. It is reachable  through Agra Jaipur Highway. The city is connected by rail  to Agra, Jaipur, Kanpur and Mathura.

The temperature in Achhnera is typical of northern India, with cold nights in winter and heat waves in summer. In winter the temperature drops to 1–2 °C and in summer it rises to 45–47 °C. Rain is always good.

Demographics
 India census, Achhnera had a population of 22,781, of which males were 12,117 and females were 10,664. Achhnera has an average literacy rate of 58.7%, with 65.8% of the males and 50.7% of females literate. Population in the age group of 0 to 6 years was 3,313. The Scheduled Castes and Scheduled Tribes population were 4,890 and 6 respectively. Achhnera had 3665 households as of 2011.

Employment
There are few opportunities of employment in Achnera. People travel to nearby cities like Agra, Mathura, Bharatpur for employment. Achnera is surrounded by villages and the economy mainly depends on agriculture. The agricultural production depends on the weather, rains on proper time.

References

Cities and towns in Agra district